Mount Carillon is a  mountain summit located on the crest of the Sierra Nevada mountain range in California. It is situated on the common border of Tulare County with Inyo County, as well as the shared boundary of Sequoia National Park and John Muir Wilderness. Carillon has subpeaks, unofficially called "The Cleaver" (0.4 mile to the northeast, and "Impala" (12,073+ ft/3,680+ m), on the southeast ridge.

History
The first ascent of the summit was made in 1925, by Norman Clyde, who is credited with 130 first ascents, most of which were in the Sierra Nevada. The peak's name was submitted by Chester Versteeg of the Sierra Club, and officially adopted by the United States Board on Geographic Names in 1937. It is so named because it is shaped like a bell tower, which often houses a carillon.

Climate
According to the Köppen climate classification system, Mount Carillon has an alpine climate. Most weather fronts originate in the Pacific Ocean, and travel east toward the Sierra Nevada mountains. As fronts approach, they are forced upward by the peaks, causing them to drop their moisture in the form of rain or snowfall onto the range (orographic lift). Precipitation runoff from this mountain drains west to the Kern River via Wallace Creek, and east to Owens Valley via Lone Pine Creek.

Climbing
Established climbing routes:

 West Ridge via Russell-Carillon saddle 1925 by Norman Clyde
 Northeast Ridge (class 3)
 Southeast Ridge (class 4)
 East Face (class 5.8) 1968 by Fred Beckey, Chuck Haas
 Impala, South Face (class 5.7) 1968 by Chuck Ray, Brad Fowler
 Impala, Diagonal Route (class 5.7) 1968 by Fred Beckey, Charlie Raymond
 The Winged Horse (class 5.8) 1970 by Fred Beckey, Jack Miller
 Sweet Carillon (class 5.10+) 2008 by Andre Kiryanov, Shay Har-Noy

Gallery

See also

 List of mountain peaks of California

References

External links
 Weather forecast: Mount Carillon
 Mt. Carillon rock climbing: Mountainproject.com

Mountains of Tulare County, California
Mountains of Sequoia National Park
Inyo National Forest
Mountains of Inyo County, California
Mountains of the John Muir Wilderness
North American 4000 m summits
Mountains of Northern California
Sierra Nevada (United States)